HD 33636 is a binary system located approximately 94 light-years away in Orion constellation. The visible member HD 33636 A is a 7th magnitude yellow main-sequence star. It is located at a distance of 91.6 light years from Earth. It has a metallicity of −0.05 ± 0.07.

A companion was discovered in 2002 with a minimum mass of planet size.  This was ascertained to be a low-mass star in 2007, making it HD 33636 B.

HD 33636 B 
HD 33636 B was discovered in 2002 by the Keck telescope in Hawaii. It was independently detected at the Haute-Provence Observatory  in France. With this method it showed a minimum mass of 10.58 Jupiter masses, and was initially assumed to be a planet and provisionally labelled "HD 33636 b" (lower-case).

In 2007, Bean et al. used the Hubble Space Telescope (HST) and he found that this body has an inclination as little as 4.1 ± 0.1°, which yielded the true mass of 142 Jupiter masses. This is too high to be a planet. It is now classified as an M-dwarf star of spectral type M6V, "HD 33636 B" (upper-case).

This star takes 2117 days or 5.797 years to orbit at the average distance of 3.27 Astronomical Units (AU).

References

External links 
 
 

033636
024205
Orion (constellation)
Binary stars
G-type main-sequence stars
M-type main-sequence stars
Durchmusterung objects